The Angel Glacier is an extensive glacier which flows down the north face of Mount Edith Cavell in Jasper National Park, Canada. 
It is named as such because it has the appearance of an angel with out-swept wings. It was significantly larger when it was named in the 19th-century and is melting rapidly. It is not expected to maintain its shape, and will most likely disappear.

The glacier is visible from the Cavell Meadows hiking trail.

See also
List of glaciers in Canada

References

Glaciers of Alberta
Jasper National Park